The Dedicated freight corridors in India are a network of broad gauge freight railway lines that solely serve freight trains, thus making the freight service in India faster and more efficient. The Dedicated Freight Corridor Corporation of India is responsible for undertaking planning, development, and mobilisation of financial resources and construction, maintenance and operation of these corridors.

History

After establishing the British Rule in India, the Britishers introduced trains to facilitate cargo transport from the heartlands of India to the trading centres that they had set up. The first proposals for freight railways in India were made in Madras (now Chennai) back in 1832. The first train in India ran from Red Hills to Chintadripet bridge in 1837. It was named the Red Hill Railway and it used a rotary steam locomotive manufactured by William Avery. The railway was built by Sir Arthur Cotton and was mainly used for transporting granite stones for road-building work in Madras. Later in 1845, Cotton built the Godavari Dam Construction Railway at Dowleswaram in Rajahmundry, to supply stone for construction of a dam on the Godavari River. In 1851, the Solani Aqueduct Railway was built in Roorkee. The freight was hauled by a steam locomotive called Thomason, named after a British officer. It was used for transporting construction materials for an aqueduct over the Solani river. These freight railway lines were later dismantled.

On 8 May 1845, the Madras Railway was incorporated, and the East Indian Railway Company (EIR) was incorporated the same year. On 1 August 1849, the Great Indian Peninsula Railway (GIPR) was incorporated by an Act of Parliament. Soon a country-wide railway network was established with both passenger services and freight services using it.

At the end of the 20th century, India had built one of the largest networks of railways, but the timely freight transport services were not provided with the priority and freight trains were often halted abruptly to pave the way for passenger trains. The Indian logistics cost was also sky high, taking up 13-15% share of India's GDP. Hence, there was need of a solution which would ease the burden on modern railway network and boost India's industrial growth.

Proposals

As the need for a dedicated freight corridor arose, in December 2006, an agreement was signed between India and Japan for the Development of two exclusive rail freight corridors, also known as Dedicated Freight Corridors (DFC) as a part of economic co-operation for industry and trade. One between Delhi and Mumbai, termed as Western Corridor and other between Delhi and Kolkata termed as Eastern Corridor. A band of 150 km each on either side of this corridor was planned to be developed exclusively for industrial development.

Construction

List of corridors

Summary
 

Green background for the systems that are under construction. Blue background for the systems that are currently in planning.

Impact
The dedicated freight corridors aim to bring down the cost of freight transport, by using electrical fuel, longer trains with more capacity(The western DFC utilises double stacking to transport more containers), thus helping Indian industries to become competitive in the world export market. These corridors will also help India achieve the targets it has committed to in the Paris Climate Accords, by switching from diesel propelled freight trains and fossil fuel-based road traffic to the electricity based railway locomotives. India is growing in renewable energy production, with most of the country's new electricity generation capacity being added through solar, wind and nuclear sources.

The new generation pantograph allows an increase in the height of the overhead wires (catenary height) from the standard  to  -setting the world record for the high reach pantograph for highest catenary for electric locomotives, this will also enable Indian railways to introduce double-decker passenger trains in high-density suburban passenger route and RORO cargo service across the Indian railways network. The Indian passenger railway network will be able to run semi-high speed and high-speed trains in the existing network, as 70% of cargo traffic will migrate to the dedicated freight corridors. Only low platforms will be permissible.

While the Konkan railway is the only railway zone in India, which has streamlined the RORO service and is able to save 75 million litre diesel fuel and related foreign exchange for the country. RORO services are deployed in East central railway, Northeast Frontier railway zones along with Konkan railway, but, RORO has  failed to be successful in existing electrical railway infrastructure because of the height of the overhead electrical wires.

Proposed projects
Rebuild overhead bridges to increase vertical and horizontal clearances.
Lengthening sidings/passing loops at every stations.
Remove high platforms and replaced with longer low platforms.
Upgrade signalling systems.
To build more rail links with Pakistan, including reopening.
Track doubling for the single-track routes.
Electrification for the diesel routes.

See also
Freight transport
Transport in India
Rail transport in India
High-speed rail in India
Urban rail transit in India
List of high-speed railway lines in India
Multi-Modal Logistics Parks in India
Aerial lift in India
Bus rapid transit in India
Future of rail transport in India

References

External links
 Dedicated Freight Corridor Corporation of India (DFCCIL) Official Website
 Dedicated Freight Corridor Corporation of India (DFCCIL) Official link for project status
 DFCC will use New Track Construction machine having capacity of 1.5 KM of track per day
 March 2014 news article stating near total land acquisition and environmental clearances

Use dmy dates from February 2022
Dedicated freight corridors of India
Railway companies of India
Proposed infrastructure in India